Grated cheese is cheese that has been grated. Typically, aged hard cheeses are used. Cheese can be grated by hand using a  hand grater, and can be bought already grated. Commercial grated cheeses are often blends of cheeses.

Shredded cheese is coarser and cooks differently.

Popular types of grated cheese:
 Cheshire cheese
 Parmesan
 Reggianito
 Red Leicester
 Cheddar cheese
 Edam cheese

External links

Characteristics of cheese